John F. Kennedy Catholic School, often referred to as Warren JFK, is a private, Catholic school in Warren, Ohio, United States. It is owned and operated by the Roman Catholic Diocese of Youngstown and is divided into two campuses: the Upper Campus for grades 6–12 and the Lower Campus for grades K–5. The school athletic teams are known as the Eagles. The current building opened in 1964 as a replacement for St. Mary High School and was known as John F. Kennedy High School. Initial plans called for the new building to be named Annunciation High School, but after the assassination of John F. Kennedy in 1963, area Catholics asked the diocese to name the new school after Kennedy. In 2007, the school expanded to grades K-12 and was renamed John F. Kennedy Catholic School by adding the former Blessed Sacrament School. A junior high school program for 7th and 8th grades was added to the high school building, which was renamed the Upper Campus, while the former Blessed Sacrament School was renamed the Lower Campus for grades K–6. Later, 6th grade was moved to the Upper Campus. As of the 2017–18 school year, the school serves approximately 600 students in grades K–12, with over 300 at the Upper Campus.

Clubs and activities
National Honor Society
Relay for Life
Student Senate
Speech and Debate
Spirit Club
Key Club
PREP Programs

From 2010 to 2014, each spring, the school put on a variety show encompassing aspects of both the performing arts and a visual art display. The show is called Kennedy Honors Excellence in the Arts, and was modeled after the Kennedy Center Honors that take place annually in Washington DC. The event showcased the talents of students in the areas of visual, vocal, instrumental and acting performance. In addition, the show paid tribute to an individual who has greatly benefited performing arts at JFK. Since 2015, the variety show has been rebranded Fiddlesticks and become almost entirely student-run.

Scholarships 
Kennedy has a tuition assistance program for students in Grades K–12.

Athletics
Kennedy varsity sports include:
Boys' and girls' soccer
Boys' and girls' cross country
Football
Boys' and girls' tennis
Boys' and girls' golf
Boys' and girls' basketball
Boys' and girls' track and field
Boys' and girls' bowling
Baseball
Softball
Volleyball
Cheerleading

State championships

 Football – 1991, 2016
 Boys' golf – 1974, 2000, 2001
 Boys' track and field - 2015
 Baseball - 2021

Notable alumni
 Chris Columbus, filmmaker
 Hugh Hewitt, radio talk show host, FOX News contributor
 Jason Kokrak, professional golfer
 Tim Ryan, politician

References

External links
 

Roman Catholic Diocese of Youngstown
High schools in Trumbull County, Ohio
Catholic secondary schools in Ohio
Educational institutions established in 1964
Private middle schools in Ohio
Warren, Ohio
1964 establishments in Ohio